Robert Ireland Pryde (25 April 1913 – 30 June 1998) was a Scottish footballer, who played for East Fife, St Johnstone and Blackburn Rovers. He also appeared as a guest player for West Ham United later in World War II.

In the summer of 1949, he joined Wigan Athletic as a player-manager. During the 1949–50 season, he played 22 games and scored two goals in the Lancashire Combination as the club finished as the league's runners-up. He decided to end his playing career before the start of the following season, and went on to win the league title as manager. He left the club in January 1952.

Honours
As manager
 Lancashire Combination: 1950–51

References

External links
 

1913 births
1998 deaths
People from Methil
Scottish footballers
Association football central defenders
East Fife F.C. players
St Johnstone F.C. players
Blackburn Rovers F.C. players
Wigan Athletic F.C. managers
West Ham United F.C. wartime guest players
Wigan Athletic F.C. players
Scottish Football League players
English Football League players
English Football League representative players
Scottish football managers